Alban Charles Philias Arnold (19 November 1892 – 7 July 1916) was an English first-class cricketer. Arnold was a right-handed batsman who played primarily as a wicketkeeper.

Arnold was a son of the Reverend Charles Lowther Arnold, vicar of Holy Trinity Church, Fareham. He was educated at Twyford School and Malvern College, then went up to Magdalene College, Cambridge in 1911. He made his first-class debut for Cambridge University in 1912 against the touring South Africans. That same year Arnold made his County Championship debut for Hampshire against Surrey. Arnold represented Hampshire four times in the 1912 season, and in 1913 Arnold played a single first-class match for Hampshire against Cambridge University.

In the 1914 English cricket season Arnold represented both Hampshire and Cambridge University. While playing for Cambridge University in a match against the Marylebone Cricket Club, Arnold made his highest career score of 89. In  the 1914 County Championship Arnold played a number of good innings for Hampshire in the County Championship, making scores of 54 against Kent, 69 against Lancashire, 76 against Somerset and 51 against Warwickshire.

Arnold's first-class career came to an end with the outbreak of the First World War. Arnold was commissioned in the British Army with the rank of second lieutenant in the Royal Fusiliers. Arnold was killed in action while serving with the eighth battalion of his regiment on 7 July 1916 at Ovillers-la-Boisselle in northern France during the Battle of the Somme. He has no known grave and is commemorated on the Thiepval Memorial.

Wisden remarked on Arnold's promise by concluding: "He would probably have developed into a cricketer of very high class."

References

External links
Alban Arnold  at Cricinfo
Alban Arnold  at CricketArchive
Matches and detailed statistics for Alban Arnold

1892 births
1916 deaths
People from Tattenhall
English cricketers
Hampshire cricketers
Cambridge University cricketers
Free Foresters cricketers
Royal Fusiliers officers
British military personnel killed in the Battle of the Somme
British Army personnel of World War I
Cricketers from Cheshire
People educated at Malvern College
Alumni of Magdalene College, Cambridge
Military personnel from Cheshire